Charles Hayne Seale Hayne PC (22 October 1833 – 22 November 1903) of Fuge House in the parish of Blackawton and of Kingswear Castle, Dartmouth harbour, both in Devon, was a British businessman and Liberal politician, serving as Member of Parliament for Ashburton in Devon, from 1885 until his death in 1903. He served as Paymaster-General between 1892 and 1895 in the Liberal administrations of William Gladstone and the Earl of Rosebery.

Political career
Called to the bar in 1857, Seale Hayne was Liberal Member of Parliament for Ashburton, Devon, from 1885 until his death in 1903. He served under Gladstone and later the Earl of Rosebery as Paymaster-General from 1892 to 1895 and was appointed a Privy Counsellor in 1892. Apart from his political career he was also the first Chairman of the Dartmouth and Torbay Railway, and Lieutenant-Colonel of the 3rd Battalion (2nd Devon Militia), Devonshire Regiment, becoming its Honorary Colonel when he retired from the command in 1894.

Personal life
Seale Hayne died in November 1903, aged 70, in Mayfair, London, and was buried in Kensal Green Cemetery. In his will he endowed a farming and food science college near Newton Abbot. Seale-Hayne College opened in 1919, later becoming part of the University of Plymouth. The University's Charles Seale-Hayne Library is named in his honour.

Notes

References
Concise Dictionary of National Biography, 1932

External links 
 

1833 births
1903 deaths
Liberal Party (UK) MPs for English constituencies
Members of the Privy Council of the United Kingdom
UK MPs 1885–1886
UK MPs 1886–1892
UK MPs 1892–1895
UK MPs 1895–1900
UK MPs 1900–1906
Burials at Kensal Green Cemetery
Members of the Parliament of the United Kingdom for Ashburton
British Militia officers
Devon Militia officers